The Fight for Right Movement was founded in August 1915 by Francis Younghusband. Its aim was to increase support for the First World War in Great Britain and to boost morale in the armed forces.

History
Membership cost five shillings and members were pledged to 'fight for right till right be won', a call against disaffection in the progress and conduct of the war. The movement also advocated thrift in wartime.

An early meeting of the movement took place at the Aeolian Hall concert venue in London and musical composition and performance played an important part in the group's work. Edward Elgar composed "Fight for Right" for the group, to a text by William Morris, while Hubert Parry turned to William Blake and composed "Jerusalem" for the movement, with both first performed on 21 March 1916 at a rally at Queen's Hall.

Many of the leading members of the movement were connected with Britain's War Propaganda Bureau, known as Wellington House.

Some early members such as Parry later became disaffected and the movement did not survive the war.

List of early supporters

 James Bryce, 1st Viscount Bryce, President
 Thomas Hardy, Vice President
 Edward Elgar, Vice President
 Hubert Parry, Vice President
 Robert Bridges, Vice President
 James Lowther, 1st Viscount Ullswater, Vice President
 Gilbert Murray, Vice President
 George Walter Prothero, Vice President
 Millicent Fawcett
 Caroline Spurgeon
 Sir Frederick Pollock, 3rd Baronet, Chairman of Executive Committee
 Gervase Elwes
 Philip Kerr, 11th Marquess of Lothian
 Evelyn Underhill
 Henry Newbolt
 Maurice Hewlett
 L. P. Jacks
 Frederick Whyte
 Wickham Steed
 Émile Cammaerts
 Paul Painlevé
 Rev. William Temple

References

External links
 For the Right: essays and addresses by members of the Fight for Right Movement (Internet Archive)

Political advocacy groups in the United Kingdom